The Yap cicadabird (Edolisoma nesiotis), sometimes considered to be a distinctive subspecies of the common cicadabird, is a species of bird in the cuckooshrike  family, Campephagidae. It is endemic to Yap, a small island cluster in the western Caroline Islands, and part of the Federated States of Micronesia in the western Pacific Ocean. It inhabits the dry tropical forest there.

References

External links 
 Call of Yap cicadabird on Xeno-canto

Yap cicadabird
Birds of Yap
Yap cicadabird
Yap cicadabird
Yap cicadabird